2-Methyltridecane is an organic compound with chemical formula C14H30. It is an isomer of tetradecane. It can be produced by reducing 2,2-dimethyl-3-decylthiirane. Metallic lanthanum in tetrahydrofuran can reduce 2-iodo-2-methyltridecane into 2-methyltridecane. In this reaction, the byproducts include 12,12,13,13-tetramethyltetracosane and some alkenes. Adding hydrogen to 13-bromo-2-methyldecan-2-ol  can produce some 2-methyltridecane. This reaction is catalyzed by Raney nickel.

References

Alkanes